A Scientist at the Seashore is a 1984 book written by American physicist James Trefil. It is Trefil's fourth book.

Overview
A noted physicist and popular science writer heads for the beach to answer common and uncommon questions about the ocean: why the sea is salty, how bubbles form on the water's surface, where waves come from, and other curiosities of the marine world.

Reviews

Popular science books
1984 non-fiction books